Maçanet de la Selva is a Spanish municipality in the province of Girona, situated in the comarca of the Selva, Catalonia. It is an important communications junction, where the routes from the coast meet those from the Prelittoral Depression to form a single axis north towards Girona and the French border. RENFE railway lines run both south-east (with the N-II road) towards Blanes and the coasts of the Maresme and south-west (with the A-7 autopista and the C-251 road) towards Granollers: the station is shared with the neighbouring municipality of Massanes.

Main sights
Romanesque church of Sant Llorenç
Church of Sant Pere de Martorell
Torcafelló Castle
Montbarbat Iberian settlement

References

 Panareda Clopés, Josep Maria; Rios Calvet, Jaume; Rabella Vives, Josep Maria (1989). Guia de Catalunya, Barcelona: Caixa de Catalunya.  (Spanish).  (Catalan).

External links

Official website 
 Government data pages 

Municipalities in Selva
Populated places in Selva